Albin Ström (1892 in Ånimskog – 1962) was a Swedish socialist politician from Gothenburg. As a young Social Democrat, Ström joined Zeth Höglund in 1917 when the party was split in two, as Höglund's radical left-wing was expelled. The left-wing soon formed the Swedish Communist Party, but in 1923 Ström left the CP and rejoined the Social Democratic Party.

From 1928 Albin Ström was member of the Riksdag, first as a Social Democrat, then as a member of the Kilbom Communist Party, and from 1940 as party leader for the Left Socialist Party.

1892 births
1962 deaths
People from Åmål Municipality
Members of the Riksdag from the Social Democrats
Swedish communists
Socialist Party (Sweden, 1929) politicians